Stercobilinogen  (fecal urobilinogen) is a chemical created by bacteria in the gut. It is made of broken-down hemoglobin. It is further processed to become the chemical that gives feces its brown color.

Bilirubin is a pigment that results from the breakdown of the heme portion of hemoglobin. The liver conjugates bilirubin, making it water-soluble; and the conjugated form is then excreted in urine as urobilinogen. Urobilinogen is colourless and is further oxidised to stercobilin which imparts colour to feces. Darkening of feces upon standing in air is due to the oxidation of residual urobilinogens to urobilins. In  the intestine, bilirubin is converted by bacteria to stercobilinogen. Stercobilinogen is absorbed and excreted by either the liver or the kidney. Stercobilinogen is oxidized to stercobilin, which is responsible for the pigmentation of feces.

References

Pyrroles
Gamma-lactams

Harpers illustrated biochemistry 28th Ed.
Harrison’s principles of internal medicine 20th Ed.